Tembo is a 1951 American documentary film which follows the travels of hunter Howard Hill through equatorial Africa. Hill produced and directed the documentary.  The expedition traveled 30,000 miles as they attempted to discover a remote tribe, called the "Leopard Men".

References

External links

American documentary films
1951 documentary films
1951 films
RKO Pictures films
Documentary films about Africa
1950s English-language films
1950s American films